St. Mary Church is the church of the Catholic parish of St. Mary in Lillehammer the administrative capital and largest city of the province of Innlandet, in southern Norway. The parish includes Oppland County and Ringsaker municipality in Hedmark County. The church is situated in Suttestad, an area to the south of the city of Lillehammer. The parish also operates chapels of ease in Gjøvik, Oppa, and Dokka.

The community was established in 1956, with worship taking place in a private chapel until 1970. In that year, the main church was constructed to plans by architect Carl Corwin. In 2010, the church was consecrated by Bishop Bernt Eidsvig, and the altar consecrated with relics.

See also

Roman Catholicism in Norway

References

Buildings and structures in Lillehammer
Churches in Innlandet
Roman Catholic churches completed in 1970
Christian organizations established in 1956
20th-century Roman Catholic church buildings in Norway